The Amazon rainforest is the largest rainforest in the world, covering an area of 3,000,000 km2 (1,158,306.48 square miles). It represents over half of the planet's rainforests and comprises the largest and most biodiverse tract of tropical rainforest in the world. This region includes territory belonging to nine nations. The majority of the forest is contained within Brazil, with 60%, followed by Peru with 13%, Colombia with 10%, and with minor amounts in Venezuela, Ecuador, Bolivia, Guyana, Suriname and French Guiana.

The cattle sector of the Brazilian Amazon, incentivized by the international beef and leather trades, has been responsible for about 80% of all deforestation in the region, or about 14% of the world's total annual deforestation, making it the world's largest single driver of deforestation. The vast majority of agricultural activity resulting in deforestation was subsidized by government tax revenue. By 1995, 70% of formerly forested land in the Amazon, and 91% of land deforested since 1970 had been converted to cattle ranching. Much of the remaining deforestation within the Amazon has resulted from farmers clearing land (sometimes using the slash-and-burn method) for small-scale subsistence agriculture or mechanized cropland producing soy, palm, and other crops.

More than one-third of the Amazon Forest belongs to more than 3,344 formally acknowledged indigenous territories. Until 2015, only 8% of Amazonian deforestation occurred in forests inhabited by indigenous peoples, while 88% of occurred in the less than 50% of the Amazon area that is neither indigenous territory nor protected area. Historically, the livelihoods of indigenous Amazonian peoples have depended on the forest for food, shelter, water, fiber, fuel and medicines. The forest is also interconnected with their identity and cosmology. For this reason, the deforestation rates are lower in indigenous territories despite strong pressures.

According to 2018 satellite data compiled by a deforestation monitoring program called Prods, deforestation has hit its highest rate in a decade. About 7,900 km2 (3,050 sq miles) of the rainforest was destroyed between August 2017 and July 2018. Most of the deforestation occurred in the states of Mato Grosso and Pará. BBC News reported the environment minister, Edson Duarte, as saying illegal logging was to blame, but critics suggest expanding agriculture is also encroaching on the rainforest. It is suggested that at some point the forest will reach a tipping point, where it will no longer be able to produce enough rainfall to sustain itself. According to a November 2021 report by Brazil's INPE, based on satellite data, deforestation has increased by 22% over 2020 and is at its highest level since 2006.

In the pre-Columbian era, parts of the rainforest were widely populated regions with open agriculture. After European colonization occurred in the 16th century due to the hunt for gold and later the rubber boom, the Amazon rainforest was depopulated due to European diseases and slavery, so the forest grew larger.

Prior to the 1970s, access to the forest's largely roadless interior was difficult, and aside from partial clearing along rivers, the forest remained intact. Deforestation accelerated greatly following the opening of highways deep into the forest, such as the Trans-Amazonian highway in 1972.

In parts of the Amazon, poor soil made plantation-based agriculture unprofitable. The key turning point in deforestation of the Brazilian Amazon was when colonists began to establish farms within the forest during the 1960s. Their farming system was based on crop cultivation and the slash-and-burn method. However, the colonists were unable to successfully manage their fields and the crops due to the loss of soil fertility and weed invasion due to this method.

In indigenous areas of the Peruvian Amazon such as the Urarina's Chambira River Basin, the soils are productive for only relatively short periods of time, therefore causing indigenous horticulturalists like the Urarina to move to new areas and clear more and more land. Amazonian colonization was ruled by cattle raising because ranching required little labor, generated decent profits, and land under state ownership to private companies, without term limits on property rights. While the law was promoted as a "reforestation" measure, critics claimed the privatization measure would in fact encourage further deforestation of the Amazon, while surrendering the nation's rights over natural resources to foreign investors and leaving uncertain the fate of Peru's indigenous people, who do not typically hold formal title to the forestlands on which they subsist. Law 840 met widespread resistance and was eventually repealed by Peru's legislature for being unconstitutional.

In 2015, illegal deforestation in the Amazon was on the rise again for the first time in decades; this was largely a result of consumer demand for products like palm oil. As consumer pressure increases, Brazilian farmers clear their land to make more space for crops like palm oil, and soy. Also, studies done by Greenpeace showed that 300 billion tons of carbon, 40 times the annual greenhouse gas emissions from fossil fuels, are stored in trees. In addition to the carbon release associated with deforestation, NASA has estimated that if deforestation levels proceed, the remaining world's forests will disappear in about 100 years. The Brazilian government adopted a program called RED (United Nations Reducing emissions from deforestation and forest degradation Program) in order to help prevent deforestation. The RED program has helped more than 44 countries across Africa with the development of education programs and has donated more than $117 million to the program.

As of January 2019, the president of Brazil – Jair Bolsonaro – has made an executive order that allows the agriculture ministry to oversee some of the land in the Amazon. Cattle ranchers and mining companies favor the president's decision. Brazilian economic policy is influencing the government to condone development on tribal territory in order to accumulate exports and increase economic growth. That has been criticized because taking away tribal land will endanger the indigenous people who live there now. The deforestation of the Amazon leads acceleration of climate change, increasing the relative contribution of Brazil to climate change.

Causes of deforestation

Deforestation of the Amazon rainforest can be attributed to many different factors at local, national, and international levels. The rainforest is seen as a resource for cattle pasture, valuable hardwoods, housing space, farming space (especially for soybeans), road works (such as highways and smaller roads), medicines and human gain. Trees are usually cut down illegally.

Cattle farming
A 2004 World Bank paper and a 2009 Greenpeace report found that the cattle sector in the Brazilian Amazon, supported by the international beef and leather trades, was responsible for about 80% of all deforestation in the region, or about 14% of the world's total annual deforestation, making it the largest single driver of deforestation in the world. According to a 2006 report by the Food and Agriculture Organization of the United Nations, 70% of formerly forested land in the Amazon, and 91% of land deforested since 1970, is used for livestock pasture.
The 2019 European Union–Mercosur Free Trade Agreement, which forms one of the world's largest free trade areas, has been denounced by environmental activists and indigenous rights campaigners. The fear is that the deal could lead to more deforestation of the Amazon rainforest as it expands market access to Brazilian beef.

Jair Bolsonaro´s government, weakened some environmental laws with a cut in funding and personnel at key government agencies and a firing of the heads of the agency's state bodies. Deforestation of the Amazon rainforest accelerated during the COVID-19 pandemic in Brazil. According to Brazil's National Institute for Space Research (INPE), deforestation in the Brazilian Amazon rose more than 50% in the first three months of 2020 compared to the same three-month period in 2019.

Soy bean
Deforestation in the Amazon has resulted from farmers clearing land for mechanized cropland. Scientists using NASA satellite data found in 2006 that clearing for mechanized cropland had become a significant force in Brazilian Amazon deforestation. This change in land use alters the region's climate. Researchers found that in 2004, a peak year of deforestation, more than 20% of the Mato Grosso state's forests were converted to cropland. 
In 2005, soybean prices fell by more than 25% and some areas of Mato Grosso showed a decrease in large deforestation events, suggesting that the rise and fall of prices for other crops, beef and timber may also have a significant impact on future land use in the region.

A major driver of forest loss in the Amazon has been the cultivation of soy, mainly for export and production of biodiesel and animal feed; as soybean prices have risen, soy farmers have pushed northwards into forested areas of the Amazon. However, a private sector agreement referred to as the Soy Moratorium has helped drastically reduce the deforestation linked to soy production in the region. In 2006, a number of major commodity trading companies, such as Cargill agreed to not purchase soybeans produced in the Brazilian Amazon in recently deforested areas. Before the moratorium, 30% of soy field expansion had occurred through deforestation, contributing to record deforestation rates. After eight years of the moratorium, a 2015 study found that although soy production area had expanded another 1.3 million hectares, only about 1% of the new soy expansion had come at the expense of forest. In response to the moratorium, farmers were choosing to plant on already cleared land.
The needs of soy farmers have been used to validate some controversial transportation projects that have been developed in the Amazon. The first two highways, the Belém-Brasília (1958) and the Cuiabá-Porto Velho (1968), were the only federal highways in the Legal Amazon to be paved and passable year-round before the late 1990s. These two highways are said to be "at the heart of the 'arc of deforestation'", which at present is the focal point area of deforestation in the Brazilian Amazon. The Belém-Brasília highway attracted nearly two million settlers in its first twenty years. The success of the Belém-Brasília highway in opening up the forest was re-enacted as paved roads continued to be developed, unleashing the irrepressible spread of settlement. The completion of the roads was followed by a wave of resettlement; these settlers had a significant effect on the forest as well.

Logging
A 2013 paper found that the more rainforest is logged in the Amazon, the less precipitation reaches the area and so the lower the yield per hectare becomes. Thus, for Brazil as a whole, there is no economic gain to be made by logging and selling trees and using the logged land for pastoral purposes.

Crude oil
A September 2016 Amazon Watch report concludes that imports of crude oil by the US are driving rainforest destruction in the Amazon and releasing significant greenhouse gases.

Other
In August 2019, the Amazon experienced a forest fire that lasted for months. The forest fire became another major reason for deforestation in the summer of 2019. The Amazon shrunk by 519 square miles (1,345 square kilometers) that summer.
Some deforestation in the Amazon has resulted from farmers clearing land for small-scale subsistence agriculture

Loss rates

Deforestation of the Amazon rainforest continued to accelerate in the early 2000s, reaching an annual rate of 27,423 km2 of forest loss in the year 2004. The annual rate of forest loss generally slowed between 2004 and 2012, though rates of deforestation jumped again in 2008, 2013 and 2015.

Today the loss of remaining forest cover appears to be accelerating again. Between August 2017 and July 2018,  were deforested in Brazil – a 13.7% rise over the previous year and the largest area cleared since 2008. Deforestation in the Brazilian Amazon rainforest rose more than 88% in June 2019 compared with the same month in 2018, and more than doubled in January 2020 compared with the same month in 2019.

In August 2019, 30,901 individual forest fires were reported, three times the number a year earlier. The number dropped by a third in September, and by October 7 the number was down to about 10,000. Deforestation is said to be worse than burning. Brazil's satellite agency, National Institute for Space Research (INPE), estimated that at least 7,747 km2 of Brazilian Amazon rainforest were cleared during early and mid-2019. INPE subsequently reported that deforestation in the Brazilian Amazon reached a 12-year high between August 2019 and July 2020.

In Brazil, the Instituto Nacional de Pesquisas Espaciais (INPE, or National Institute of Space Research) produces deforestation figures annually. Their deforestation estimates are derived from 100 to 220 images taken during the dry season in the Amazon by the Landsat satellite and may only consider the loss of the Amazon rainforest – not the loss of natural fields or savannah within the Amazon biome.
 Estimated loss by year

Impacts 

Deforestation and loss of biodiversity have led to high risks of irreversible changes to the Amazon's tropical forests. It has been suggested by modelling studies that the deforestation may be approaching a "tipping point", after which large-scale "savannization" or desertification of the Amazon will take place, with catastrophic consequences for the world's climate, due to a self-perpetuating collapse of the region's biodiversity and ecosystems. Not averting the tipping point, could have severe economic, natural capital and ecosystem services impacts. A study published in Nature climate change in 2022 provided direct empirical evidence that more than three-quarters of the Amazon rainforest has been losing resilience since the early 2000s, risking dieback with implications for biodiversity, carbon storage and climate change.

In order to retain high biodiversity, research supports a threshold of 40% forest cover in the Amazon.

Impact on global warming

Deforestation like other ecosystem destruction (such as peatbog degradation) can both reduce the carbon sink value of land while increasing emissions through wildfires, land-use change, and reduced ecosystem health, causing stress in normal carbon absorbing ecosystem process.

However, a 2021  scientific review article found that current evidence shows the Amazon basin is currently emitting more greenhouse gases than it absorbs overall. Climate change  impacts and human activities in the area – mainly wildfires, current land-use and deforestation – are causing a release of forcing agents that were found to likely result in a net warming effect overall as of 2021.

Impacts on water supply 
The deforestation of the Amazon rainforest has had a significant negative impact on Brazil's freshwater supply, harming, among others, the agricultural industry that has contributed to the clearing of the forests. In 2005, parts of the Amazon basin experienced the worst drought in more than a century. This has been the result of two factors:

1. The rainforest provides much of the rainfall in Brazil, even in areas far from it. Deforestation increased the impacts of the droughts of 2005, 2010, and 2015–2016.

2. The rainforest, by inducing rainfall and helping with water storage, provides freshwater to the rivers that give water to Brazil and other countries.

Impact on local temperature 
In 2019, a group of scientists published research suggesting that in a "business as usual" scenario, the deforestation of the Amazon rainforest will raise the temperature in Brazil by 1.45 degrees. They wrote: "Increased temperatures in already hot locations may increase human mortality rates and electricity demands, reduce agricultural yields and water resources, and contribute to biodiversity collapse, particularly in tropical regions. Furthermore, local warming may cause shifts in species distributions, including for species involved in infectious disease transmissions." The authors of the paper say that deforestation is already causing a rise in the temperature.

Impact on indigenous people

More than one-third of the Amazon forest belongs to over 4,466 formally acknowledged Indigenous Territories. Until 2015, only 8% of Amazonian deforestation occurred in forests inhabited by indigenous peoples, while 88% occurred in the less than 50% of the Amazon area that is neither indigenous territory nor protected area. Historically, the livelihoods of indigenous Amazonian peoples have depended on the forest for food, shelter, water, fibre, fuel and medicines. The forest is also interconnected with their identity and cosmology. For this reason, the deforestation rates are lower in Indigenous Territories, despite pressures encouraging deforestation being stronger.

The native tribes of the Amazon have often been abused during the Amazon's deforestation. Loggers have encroached onto native lands and killed them in resulting conflicts. Many uncontacted peoples have come out of the jungles to mingle with mainstream society after threats from outsiders. Uncontacted peoples making first contact with outsiders are susceptible to diseases to which they have little immunity. With mass epidemic deaths, entire tribes can easily be decimated within a few years.

For many years, there has been a battle to conquer the territories that indigenous people live on in the Amazon, primarily from the Brazilian government. The demand for this land has originated partly from a desire to improve Brazil's economic status. Many people, including ranchers and land swindlers from the southeast, have wanted to claim the land for their own financial gain. At the beginning of 2019, the new president of Brazil, Jair Bolsonaro, made an executive order for the agriculture ministry to regulate the land that tribal members inhabit in the Amazon.

In the past, mining locations were allowed to be constructed in the territory of an isolated tribal group called Yanomami. Because of the conditions that these indigenous people were subjected to, many of them developed health problems, including tuberculosis. If their land is used for new development, many of the tribal groups will be forced out of their homes, and many may die. On top of the mistreatment of these people, the forest itself will be taken advantage of, and many of the indigenous peoples' resources for daily life will be stripped from them.

Future of the Amazon rainforest
Using the 2005 deforestation rates, it was estimated that the Amazon rainforest would be reduced by 40% in two decades. The rate of deforestation has slowed since the early 2000s, but the forest has continued to shrink every year, and analysis of satellite data shows a sharp rise in deforestation since 2018.

Norwegian prime minister Jens Stoltenberg announced on September 16, 2008, that Norway's government would donate US$1 billion to the newly established Amazon fund. The money from this fund would go to projects aimed at slowing down the deforestation of the Amazon rainforest.

In September 2015, Brazilian president Dilma Rousseff told the United Nations that Brazil had effectively reduced the rate of deforestation in the Amazon by 82%. She also announced that over the next 15 years, Brazil aimed to eliminate illegal deforestation, restore and reforest , and recover  of degraded pastures.

In August 2017, Brazilian president Michel Temer abolished an Amazonian nature reserve the size of Denmark in Brazil's northern states of Pará and Amapá.

In May 2019, eight former environment ministers in Brazil warned, "We're facing the risk of runaway deforestation in the Amazon", as rainforest destruction increased in the first year of Jair Bolsonaro's presidency. In September 2019, Carlos Nobre, expert on the Amazon and climate change, warned that at the current rates of deforestation, it was only 20 to 30 years off from reaching a tipping point that could turn big parts of the Amazon forest into a dry savanna, especially in the southern and northern Amazon.

Bolsonaro has rejected attempts by European politicians to challenge him over the rainforest deforestation, referring to this as Brazil's domestic affairs. Bolsonaro has stated that Brazil should open more areas to mining, including in the Amazon, and that he has spoken with US president Donald Trump about a future joint development program for the Brazilian Amazon region.

The Brazilian Economy Minister, Paulo Guedes, has stated that he believes that other countries should pay Brazil for the oxygen that is produced in Brazil and used elsewhere.

At the end of August 2019 after an international outcry and warning from experts that fires can increase even more, the Brazilian government of Jair Bolsonaro began to take measures to stop the fires. The measures include:

 60 day ban for clearing forest with fires.
 Sending 44,000 soldiers to fight the fires.
 Accepting 4 planes from Chile for battling the fires.
 Accepting 12 million dollars of aid from the United Kingdom government
 Softening his position about aid from the G7.
 Appealing for a Latin America conference to preserve the Amazon

On 2 November 2021, more than 100 countries with around 85% of the world's forests agreed in the COP26 climate summit's first major agreement to end deforestation by 2030, improving on a similar 2014 agreement by now including Brazil. Signatories of the 2014 agreement, the New York Declaration on Forests, pledged to half deforestation by 2020 and end it by 2030, however in the 2014-2020 period deforestation increased.

Cost of rainforest conservation
In 2008, it was estimated by Woods Hole Research Institute (WHRC) that stoping deforestation of the Brazilian rainforest would cost USD 100-600 million per year. In 2022 another study estimated that conserving about 80% of the (Brazilian) rainforest is still feasible and the conservation of 3.5 million km2 would cost USD 1.7–2.8 billion annually. By stopping the deforestation, carbon emissions could be avoided at a cost of USD 1.33/ton of CO2, while reducing emissions from renewable fuel subsidies costs USD 100/ton and weatherization assistance programs (insulation of buildings) cost $350/ton.

See also 
 2019 Brazil wildfires
 Belo Monte Dam
 Cattle ranching
 Clearcutting
 Construction of the Trans-Amazonian Highway
 Deforestation
 Deforestation in Brazil
 Flying river
 Livestock's Long Shadow
 Logging
 IBAMA
 INCRA
 Population and energy consumption in Brazilian Amazonia
 Risks of using unsustainable agricultural practices in rainforests
 Selective logging in the Amazon rainforest
 Terra preta
 Non-timber forest products
 Orinoco Mining Arc

Fauna 
 Panthera onca onca
 Peruvian jaguar
 Southern jaguar

Bibliography
 Bradford, Alina. "Deforestation: Facts, Causes, & Effects." Live Science. Deforestation: Facts, Causes & Effects. March 4, 2015. Web. July 16, 2017.
 
 Scheer, Roddy, and Moss, Doug. "Deforestation and its Extreme Effects on Global Warming." Scientific America. Deforestation and Its Extreme Effect on Global Warming. 2017. Web. July 16, 2017.
 Tabuchi, Hiroko, Rigby, Claire, and White, Jeremy. "Amazon Deforestation, Once Tamed, now Comes Roaring Back." The New York Times. Amazon Deforestation, Once Tamed, Comes Roaring Back. Feb 24, 2017. Web. July 16, 2017.

References

External links
 
 (PDF) ARC OF DEFORESTATION EXPANSION
 Camill, Phil. "The Deforestation of the Amazon". (1999). May 31, 2011.
 "Amazon Deforestation Trend On The Increase". ScienceDaily LLC (2009). May 31, 2011.
 Butler, Rhett. "Deforestation in the Amazon". Mongabay.com. July 9, 2014.
 "Amazon Deforestation: Earth's Heart and Lungs Dismembered". LiveScience.com. January 9, 2009.
 "The Roots of Deforestation in the Amazon". Effects-of-Deforestation.com. May 31, 2011.
 "Amazon Deforestation Declines to Record Low". Nature.com. May 31, 2011.
 "Brazil confirms rising deforestation in the Amazon". March 14, 2015.
 Some people launder money. Other people launder cattle. Vox, October 19, 2022.

Amazon rainforest
Amazon
Amazon River
Amazon basin
Deforestation, Amazon
Trees of the Amazon
Articles containing video clips